Søren Wichmann (born 1964) is a Danish linguist specializing in historical linguistics, linguistic typology, Mesoamerican languages, and epigraphy. Since June 2016, he has been employed as a University Lecturer at Leiden University Centre for Linguistics, Leiden University, after having worked at different institutions in Denmark, Mexico, Germany and Russia, including, during 2003-2015, the Department of Linguistics, Max Planck Institute for Evolutionary Anthropology.

Wichmann's PhD dissertation, from the University of Copenhagen, treated the Azoyú variety of Tlapanec spoken in Guerrero, Mexico. He has written extensively about Mayan, Oto-Manguean and Mixe–Zoquean languages. He has done fieldwork on Mixe, Texistepec Popoluca and Tlapanec. Regarding Mixe–Zoquean, he has done comparative work resulting in the currently most accepted classification of the Mixe–Zoquean language family as well as a reconstruction of its vocabulary and grammar (Wichmann 1995). He also specializes in the study of Maya hieroglyphs — particularly the linguistic aspects of the deciphering of the Mayan script. Since 2007, Wichmann's work has increasingly focused on the development of quantitative methods in historical linguistics, including the development of the Automated Similarity Judgment Program.

Since its inception in 2011, Wichmann has been General Editor of Language Dynamics and Change.

Selected books

Selected articles

References

External links
Wichmann's website
Leiden University page
Google Scholar
Academia.edu

Linguists from Denmark
Danish Mesoamericanists
Mayanists
Living people
Linguists of Mesoamerican languages
20th-century Mesoamericanists
21st-century Mesoamericanists
1964 births
People from Copenhagen
Paleolinguists
Linguists of Mixe–Zoque languages
Linguists of Oto-Manguean languages
Linguists of Papuan languages
Computational linguistics researchers
University of Copenhagen alumni